Animal Logic is an Australian animation and visual effects digital studio based at Disney Studios in Sydney, New South Wales in Australia, Vancouver in Canada, and Rideback Ranch in Los Angeles, California. Established in 1991, Animal Logic has produced visual effects and animation for feature films such as the Academy Award-winning Happy Feet, Legend of the Guardians: The Owls of Ga'Hoole, Walking with Dinosaurs 3D, The Lego Movie and Peter Rabbit. The company was also recognized for its work as lead visual effects vendor on Baz Luhrmann's The Great Gatsby, which won Outstanding Achievement in Visual Effects at the 3rd AACTA Awards ceremony. In 2018, Peter Rabbit was presented with a range of accolades, including the AACTA Award for Best Visual Effects or Animation, and Australian Production Design Guild Awards (APDG) in Visual Effects Design and Drawing, Concept Illustration & Concept Models for Screen. Most recently, the company has produced work for the Warner Animation Group's The Lego Movie 2: The Second Part and Marvel Studios' Captain Marvel. It is a subsidiary of Netflix. 

Initially, Animal Logic's core business was the design and production of high-end visual effects for commercials and television programs, and early success within these fields provided a platform for expansion into feature film work. Animal Logic went on to produce visual effects for many large budget feature film projects, including Babe, Babe: Pig in the City, The Matrix,  Moulin Rouge!, Hero, House of Flying Daggers, Planet of the Apes, Harry Potter and the Goblet of Fire, World Trade Center, Fool's Gold, 300, Knowing, Australia, Sucker Punch, The Great Gatsby, and many more.

History 

In 1991, Zareh Nalbandian and Chris Godfrey formed and founded a digital studio in Crows Nest, Sydney, Australia. The company was born out of Video Paint Brush Company, which Nalbandian, who had worked there for a few years, and his colleague Godfrey acquired in a management buy-out and renamed Animal Logic.

Animal Logic moved to Fox Studios Australia in Moore Park, Sydney, in 1998. In 2003, Animal Logic began work on its first computer-animated feature film, Happy Feet, for director George Miller. Released in the United States on 17 November 2006, the project saw the company expand significantly, recruiting up to 300 artists and technicians from Australia and around the world. Happy Feet, which was the first computer animated feature film produced in Australia, went on to win the Academy Award for Best Animated Feature as well as the inaugural BAFTA Award for Best Animated Film.

Their full-length feature animation, Legend of the Guardians: The Owls of Ga'Hoole, was released on 24 September 2010 and was Australia's first animated feature to be released in 3D stereoscopic. From 2004 to 2007, the company produced bumpers for Cartoon Network. In 2011, the company produced and animated LEGO Star Wars: The Padawan Menace, a 30-minute TV special. Produced for Lucasfilm and Cartoon Network, the special premiered in the United States on Cartoon Network and was followed by a worldwide DVD and Blu-ray release. In 2012, Animal Logic acquired the assets of fellow Australian visual effects studio Fuel VFX, known for their work on feature films such as Iron Man 3, Prometheus, The Avengers, Mission: Impossible: Ghost Protocol, Cowboys & Aliens, Captain America: The First Avenger and Thor. Fuel VFX was nominated for a Visual Effects Society Award and a BAFTA Award for Best Special Visual Effects for their work on Prometheus. 2012 also saw the release of the Animal Logic-animated "Polar Bowl" campaign, consisting of a 60-second and two 30-second commercials that aired at halftime at the Super Bowl XLVI. The campaign aimed to re-launch the iconic Coca-Cola polar bear characters to a new generation. Following the success of the 3 spots, which were viewed by over 160 million people globally, the company went on to animate a 6-minute short film directed by John Stevenson to headline Coca-Cola's 2013 global campaign. The film was first released through YouTube in December 2012, followed by a worldwide international cinema release. In 2013, the company led animation and visual effects work on BBC Earth and Evergreen Films' 3D live action feature Walking with Dinosaurs 3D,

In 2014, Animal Logic provided animation services for the 2014 film The Lego Movie, which was produced by the Warner Animation Group and directed by Phil Lord and Christopher Miller. After the film's huge success, the company was split into three subsidiaries operating under the Animal Logic's group:  Animal Logic Animation, Animal Logic VFX, and Animal Logic Entertainment, a Los Angeles-based arm tasked with developing animated, VFX and hybrid feature films for the company. The following year, the company opened a  facility in Vancouver, British Columbia, Canada. The new studio initially produced work for The Lego Movie 2: The Second Part, the first in a three-film deal with Warner Bros., all of which will be developed in Canada.

In July 2022, Netflix announced plans to acquire Animal Logic in an all-cash deal.

Filmography

Awards

Film

Design

Industry

References

External links

 

Australian animation studios
Mass media companies established in 1991
Visual effects companies
Australian companies established in 1991
Companies based in Sydney
2022 mergers and acquisitions
Netflix
Australian subsidiaries of foreign companies